Bzyb Mountain Range (Ageish'kha) is a mountain range in Abkhazia on the southern slope of the western part of Greater Caucasus. The ridge is about 50 km long.

Geography 
The Bzyb Range's length is about 50 km and elevation is up to 3,033 m, it is made mainly of limestone with pronounced karst landscape. It is bounded by the valley of the Bzyb River from the north and west and partially by the valley of Kelasuri River, which separates it from the Abkhaz Range.

The highest point is mountain Khimsa (3032 m), the second highest is Mount Dzishra (2623 m). There are a number of passes, including Dow - 1387 m, Himsa - 2454 m, Gudauta. The ridge contains many karst wells, mines and caves.

From the north and west it is delimited by the Bzyb river valley, from the east - by a slight depression behind the mountain Himsa (Amtkel pass) and the river valley Amtkel, delimiting it from Abkhaz Range. To the south, it gradually decreases to the Black Sea plains. The northern slope of the ridge is steep, the southern slope is gentle and is divided into separate spur and river valleys of Hipsta, Aapsta, Western Gumista , Eastern Gumista, Kelasur.

Flora 
Bzyb Range slopes are covered with broadleaved and coniferous forests. At a higher elevations there are alpine meadows.

Tourist attractions 
It is the fourth in the list of deepest caves in the world.

See also 
Gagra Range
Kodori Range

Notes

References 

Mountain ranges of the Caucasus
Mountain ranges of Georgia (country)
Mountain ranges of Abkhazia